Jorge Góngora Montalván (born October 12, 1906 in Lima, Peru – died June 25, 1999 in Lima, Peru) was a former Peruvian footballer who played for clubs Universitario de Deportes in Peru, Unión Española in Chile and the Peru national football team in the FIFA World Cup Uruguay 1930.

External links

1906 births
1999 deaths
Footballers from Lima
Association football forwards
Peruvian footballers
Peruvian expatriate footballers
Peru international footballers
Peruvian Primera División players
Club Universitario de Deportes footballers
Unión Española footballers
Expatriate footballers in Chile
Peruvian expatriate sportspeople in Chile
1930 FIFA World Cup players